Glasgow is a historic home located at Cambridge, Dorchester County, Maryland.  It is a Federal style, gable-front, -story brick house built about 1792.  Attached is a -story frame wing dating from the early 20th century.  Local history sometimes holds that the home was the birthplace of William Vans Murray, but land records and Murray's biographical data both indicate that it is unlikely that it was ever his home. It is possible, however, that Murray stayed there for some time after his return from his service as foreign minister in the Netherlands, with his first cousin William Murray Robertson, the owner at the time.

It was listed on the National Register of Historic Places in 1976.

References

External links
, including photo from 1977, at Maryland Historical Trust

Houses in Dorchester County, Maryland
Houses on the National Register of Historic Places in Maryland
Houses completed in 1792
Federal architecture in Maryland
Cambridge, Maryland
National Register of Historic Places in Dorchester County, Maryland